"Nobody Falls Like a Fool" is a song written by Peter McCann and Mark Wright, and recorded by American country music artist Earl Thomas Conley.  It was released in September 1985 as the lead single from his Greatest Hits compilation album.  The song was Conley's tenth number one on the country chart. The single went to number one from December 14, 1985 on Billboard Hot Country Singles number-one single and from December 28, 1985 RPM Country Tracks

number on both for one week and spent a total of fifteen weeks on the country chart.

Chart performance

References

1985 songs
1985 singles
Songs written by Peter McCann
Songs written by Mark Wright (record producer)
Earl Thomas Conley songs
RCA Records singles